Tabletalk, founded 1987, is a weekly local newspaper in the West Coast region of Cape Town, South Africa. It is published once a week by Cape Community Newspapers, a division of Independent Newspapers Cape. The newspaper is distributed free to West Coast suburbs including Milnerton, Table View, Blouberg, West Beach, Parklands, Sunset Beach and Big Bay.  circulation is 60,582.

Weekly newspapers published in South Africa
Mass media in Cape Town
Publications with year of establishment missing
1987 establishments in South Africa
Newspapers established in 1987